The Perlas Spikers, also previously known as the BanKo Perlas Spikers, are a professional women's volleyball team playing in the Premier Volleyball League. The team is owned by Beach Volleyball Republic.

History
The team debuted in the 2017 season of the Premier Volleyball League (PVL).

On January 12, 2022, the team announced it was taking a leave of absence from the 2022 PVL Open Conference due to the ongoing COVID-19 pandemic.

Name changes
 Perlas Spikers (2017 Reinforced Conference, 2021 Open Conference)
 BanKo Perlas Spikers (2017 Open Conference – 2019 Open Conference)

Current roster

Coaching staff
 Head coach:Reynaldo Diaz Jr.
 Assistant coach:Manolo Refugia Jr. Michelle Carolino

Team staff
 Team manager:Rye Sordan
 Team utility:

Medical staff
 Team physician:
 Physical therapist:Marilou Regidor

Previous roster

Coaching staff
 Head coach:Reynaldo Diaz Jr.
 Assistant coach:Manolo Refugia Jr. Michelle Carolino

Team staff
 Team manager:Rye Sordan
 Team utility:

Medical staff
 Team physician:
 Physical therapist:Marilou Regidor

Coaching staff
 Head coach: Apichat Kongsawat
 Assistant coach: Michelle Carolino

Team Staff
 Team Manager: Karla Bello
 Team Utility:

Medical Staff
 Team Physician:
 Physical Therapist: Marilou Regidor

Coaching staff
 Head coach:Apichat Kongsawat
 Assistant coach:Michelle Carolino

Team Staff
 Team Manager:Karla Bello
 Team Utility:

Medical Staff
 Team Physician:
 Physical Therapist:Marilou Regidor

Coaching staff
 Head coach: Ariel dela Cruz
 Assistant coach: Michelle Carolino Ivan Izack Dionisio

Team Staff
 Team Manager: Karla Bello
 Team Utility:

Medical Staff
 Team Physician:
 Physical Therapist: Marilou Regidor

Coaching staff
 Head coach: Ariel dela Cruz
 Assistant coach: Michelle Carolino Ivan Izack Dionisio

Team Staff
 Team Manager: Karla Bello
 Team Utility:

Medical Staff
 Team Physician:
 Physical Therapist: Marilou Regidor

Coaching Staff
 Head coach: Nai Muhhamed
 Assistant coach(s): Ivan Izack Dionisio

Team Staff
 Team Manager: Karla Bello
 Team Utility:

Medical Staff
 Team Physician:
 Physical Therapist:

Coaching staff
 Head coach: Jerry Yee
 Assistant coach(s): Nai Muhhamed

Team Staff
 Team Manager: Maria Rosario "Charo" Soriano
 Team Utility:

Medical Staff
 Team Physician:
 Physical Therapist:

Honors

Team
Local

International

Individual

Imports

Notes:

Team captains
  Dzi Gervacio (2017)
  Suzanne Roces (2017 – 2018)
  Nicole Anne Tiamzon (2019)
  Jamenea Ferrer (2021)

Coaches
  Jerry Yee (2017 Reinforced Conference)
  Nai Muhhamed (2017 Open Conference)
  Ariel dela Cruz (2018 Reinforced Conference – 2018 Open Conference)
  Apichat Kongsawat (2019 Reinforced Conference)
  Reynaldo Diaz Jr. (2021 Open Conference)

Former players

Local Players

 Diana Mae Carlos
 Ma. Beatriz Dominique Tan
 Ma. Carmina Denise Acevedo
 Rapril Aguilar
 Charisse Vernon Ancheta
 Amy Ahomiro
 Amanda Villanueva
 Rysabelle Devanadera
 Jorella Marie de Jesus

Foreign Players

 Rupia Inck

 Naoko Hashimoto

 Jutarat Montripila
 Sutadta Chuewulim

 Yasemin Sahin Yildirim

 Lakia Jamiah Bright
 Jeane Mae Horton

References

Shakey's V-League
2017 establishments in the Philippines
Volleyball clubs established in 2017
Women's volleyball teams in the Philippines